Eva Dina Lawler is an Australian politician. She is a Labor member of the Northern Territory Legislative Assembly since 2016, representing the electorate of Drysdale. She was Minister for Education in the Gunner Ministry from September 2016 until June 2018, when she was made Minister for Environment and Natural Resources and Minister for Infrastructure, Planning and Logistics.

Early life and career
Lawler was born in Darwin. She and her family were evacuated after Cyclone Tracy but returned to Darwin.

Lawler completed a Bachelor of Education at the then Darwin Community College. She taught at Berry Springs Primary School, Gray Primary School and Humpty Doo Primary School. She was promoted to assistant principal, working at Anula Primary School and then Principal at Jingili Primary School. Eva also worked for the Department of Education promoting health and wellbeing in schools.

She later gained a master's degree in education and a master's in international management, a diploma in project management and an associate diploma in public service management. Before entering politics she worked for the Department of Sport and Recreation.

Lawler has two children.

Politics
Lawler seemingly faced long odds when she was nominated as Labor candidate in Drysdale for the 2016 election.  The seat's then-Country Liberal Party incumbent, Lia Finocchiaro, opted to contested the new seat of Spillett after that seat absorbed much of her old base.  Even after the redistribution, the downtown Palmerston seat still had a CLP majority of 11.5 percent, making it a comfortably safe Country Liberal seat on paper.  Labor had only won the seat once, in its 2005 landslide when it took two seats in Palmerston—the only time it had won seats there prior to 2016.  However, Labor had its majority in Drysdale redistributed away in 2008.

|}

However, by the time the writs were dropped for the 2016 election, the CLP's support in Palmerston had collapsed. One poll had the CLP on only 37 percent support in an area that had been a CLP stronghold for the better part of four decades.  On election night, the CLP's primary vote collapsed by over 20 percent, and Lawler took the seat on a swing of over 16 percent.

On 11 September 2016, Lawler was named to cabinet as Minister for Education. She was reelected in 2020 with a small swing in her favour, becoming the first Labor MP to win a second term in a Palmerston-based seat.

References

Year of birth missing (living people)
Living people
Members of the Northern Territory Legislative Assembly
Australian Labor Party members of the Northern Territory Legislative Assembly
21st-century Australian politicians
Women members of the Australian Capital Territory Legislative Assembly
Women members of the Northern Territory Legislative Assembly
21st-century Australian women politicians